El Dorado City of Gold is a pinball machine designed by Ed Krynski and released in 1984 by Gottlieb. The game features an El Dorado adventure theme.

Different versions of this game with different names were released: its predecessor the pinball machine is based on, El Dorado (1975) - a one player replay version, Gold Strike - an Add-a-ball version, Lucky Strike  an Add-A-Ball version for Italy, Target Alpha - a four player replay version, Canada Dry - a four player replay game made only for France, and Solar City - a two player replay version.

Description
Two explorers are depicted on the backglass that were portrayed by two Gottlieb video game artist, Jeri Knighton and Jeff Lee. The playfield features many drop targets.

Original version (1975)
The original version El Dorado from 1975 depicts a western theme on the backglass with a group of cowboys that found a treasure.

Design team
 Game Design: Ed Krynski
 Artwork: Larry Day

Digital versions
El Dorado City of Gold is available as a licensed table of The Pinball Arcade for several platforms and is also included in Pinball Hall of Fame: The Gottlieb Collection.

The original version El Dorado from 1975 is also available in The Pinball Arcade alongside Fireball.

References

External links
 
 

1984 pinball machines
Gottlieb pinball machines